White-barred can refer to:

 White-barred wrasse
 White-barred piculet
 Charaxes brutus, the white-barred emperor or white-barred charaxes
 Recurvaria leucatella, the lesser budmoth or white-barred groundling moth
 Acraea encedon, the common acraea, white-barred acraea or encedon acraea
 Synanthedon spheciformis, the white-barred clearwing